The Mboshi–Buja languages are a proposed intermediate clade of Bantu languages that comprise a large part of Guthrie's Zone C:
Ngondi–Ngiri (C10, some C30)
Mboshi (C20)
Buja–Ngombe languages (C37, C41)